Chinese moon moth may refer to:

Actias dubernardi (Oberthür, 1897)
Actias ningpoana C. Felder & R. Felder, 1862
Actias sinensis (Walker, 1855)

Animal common name disambiguation pages